Open Space Technology (OST) is a method for organizing and running a meeting or multi-day conference, where participants have been invited in order to focus on a specific, important task or purpose.

In contrast with pre-planned conferences where who will speak at which time will be scheduled often months in advance, and therefore subject to many changes, OST sources participants once they are physically present at the live event venue.  In this sense OST is participant-driven and less organizer-driven. Pre-planning remains essential; you simply need much less pre-planning.

The agenda and schedule of presentations is partly or mostly unknown until people begin arriving. The scheduling of speakers, topics and locations is created by people attending, once they arrive. At the end of each OST meeting, a debriefing doc is created summarizing what worked and what did not work.

It was one of the top ten organization development tools cited between 2004 and 2013.

History
The approach was originated by Harrison Owen, an Episcopal priest whose academic background and training centered on the nature and function of myth, ritual and culture. In the middle ’60s, he left academe to work with a variety of organizations including small West African villages, large corporations and NGOs, urban (American and African) community organizations, Peace Corps, Regional Medical Programs, National Institutes of Health, and Veterans Administration.

Along the way he discovered that his study of myth, ritual and culture had direct application to these social systems. In 1977, he started a consulting company in order to explore the culture of organizations in transformation as a theorist and practicing consultant.

Harrison convened the First International Symposium on Organization Transformation as a traditional conference.  Afterward, participants told him the best parts were the coffee breaks.  So when he did it again, Open Space was his way of making the whole of the conference one big coffee break, albeit with a central theme (purpose, story, question, or "myth") that would guide the self-organization of the group.

Owen's experiment was successful enough that the Organization Transformation symposium continued in Open Space format for more than twenty years.  But soon after the first Open Space, participants began using Open Space in their own work and reporting back on their learning.  One event, convened in India, around a theme of "The Business of Business is Learning," attracted local media attention that was noticed by the New York Times, who later published their own stories on Open Space, in 1988 and 1994.
 Owen wrote a Brief User's Guide to support further experimentation and practice.  Eventually, an expanded guide was published by Berrett-Koehler.

In the 1980s, Owen was considered by many large corporations to be one of several New Age consultants whose methods might encourage employee participation and interest in company problems.

Central elements

Self-organization 

"Open space" meetings are to a lesser or greater degree "self-organizing." Participants and speakers have all been invited or paid to attend.  However after confirming the overall theme and focus, the meeting organizer-sponsor is much less active.  The details of the daily speaking schedule are to a lesser or greater degree created and organized by attending participants and speakers "on the day of."

Given the potential chaotic nature of "open space" meetings, when the event begins, the organizer-sponsor gives their best shot at focusing the theme, ground rules, values and energies of the conference. This often includes short introductions of each speaker present.

The organizer-sponsor explains the "self-organizing" process along with any rules for changing times, talks and schedules once they are made public. The ideal event facilitator is "fully present and totally invisible", "holding a space" for participants to self-organize, rather than micro-managing activity and conversations (paraphrase).

Outcomes 

Because the agenda of an Open Space meeting emerges, more like a living thing, what exactly is going to happen or be addressed is unknown to a lesser or greater degree.  Still, several meaningful outcomes can and should be specifically built into the process (safety, trust, courtesy) (paraphrase).

Open Space meetings are usually convened for a few hours to a few days.  At the end of some (especially longer) open space meetings, a proceedings document is compiled from the notes taken in all of the breakout sessions.  This is distributed, on paper or electronically, to all participants and used as the basis for prioritizing issues, identifying next steps, and continuing the work beyond the meeting itself.

Where OST Has Been Used

Several other approaches share one or more features with OST: "unconferences", e.g. FooCamp and BarCamp. Both FooCamp and BarCamp are participant-driven, like OST, but neither is organized around a pre-set theme or aimed at solving a problem.  The first Foo Camp was organized by Tim O'Reilly and Sara Winge; because Sara had been a student of Harrison Owen, many elements similar to OST are used in Foo Camp.

The Open Space approach was first used in the Agile software development community at the Agile/XP Universe conference in 2002.  That group eventually developed into the Agile Alliance, which has supported the use of Open Space in the Agile community. Since then, Open Space has been used for leading Agile transformation and for requirements gathering in Agile projects.

A design sprint (a meeting technique related to design thinking and promoted by Google Ventures) is similar to OST in that participants are invited by an organizer to work collaboratively on solving a problem, with the help of a facilitator who is trained in running such meetings. (Google also uses OST methods, which one Google engineer described as "almost the *opposite* of sprints...a minimal designed conversation that still gets groups to a solid set of agreements.")

Some meeting organizers use Open Space techniques in combination with other methods, to avoid what they see as "shortcomings" of OST, for example an atmosphere that is potentially unfriendly for introverts.

Open Space in Education 
Research on Open Space Technology in higher education suggests that OST increases learner motivation (Patton et al., 2016; Pereira & Figueiredo, 2010) and stimulates critical thinking (Van Woezik et al., 2019).

See also
Art of Hosting
Meeting system
Unconference
Birds of a Feather (computing)

References

External links 

openspaceworld.org  Supporting and supported by Open Space practitioners worldwide. The site offers materials (or links to materials) in 20 different languages.
openspaceworld.net wiki for stories about Open Space technology
openspaceworld.com website of the originator of Open Space Technology, Harrison Owen

" A grounded theory study on the value associated with using open space technology by Richard 'D' Norris Abstract of the HRDV 6000 Report Webster University, Merritt Island, FL, May 2000 accessed 9/9/09

Group decision-making
Meetings
Unconferences